Ottavio Bandini (1558–1629) was a Roman Catholic cardinal.

Biography
On 25 June 1595 he was consecrated bishop by Alessandro Ottaviano de' Medici, Archbishop of Florence, with Ludovico de Torres, Archbishop of Monreale, and Gian Francesco Biandrate di San Giorgio Aldobrandini, Bishop of Acqui, serving as co-consecrators.

Episcopal succession

References

1558 births
1629 deaths
Clergy from Florence
17th-century Italian cardinals
16th-century Italian cardinals